Kyzyl Tan (lit. Red Dawn) is a Tatar language newspaper published in Bashkortostan.

It was granted the Order of the Red Banner of Labour in 1968.

Previous names:
 1918–1924: Башкортстан (Bashkiria)
 1924–1930: Яңа авыл (New Village)
 1930–1941: Коммуна (Commune)

Publication suspended during the Great Patriotic War; it restarted on 12 March 1944 under the current name.

Newspapers published in Russia
Newspapers published in the Soviet Union
Tatar-language newspapers
Ufa